We Must (stylised as Moramo,) is a parliamentary group in the City Assembly of Belgrade. It took part as a political coalition in the 2022 Serbian general election.  

Initially formed in November 2021, when Together for Serbia (ZZS), Do not let Belgrade drown (NDB) and Ecological Uprising (EU) signed an agreement to participate in the 2022 general election under a joint list, it was formalised as a coalition in January 2022. Its representatives had previously played a major role during the 2021–2022 environmental protests. The coalition won 4.7% of the popular vote and managed to cross the electoral threshold, while its presidential candidate, Biljana Stojković, won 3.3% of the popular vote.   

Following the election, a part of the coalition had transformed into the Together (Z) political party in June 2022. We Must describes itself as a "green-left" coalition. Inside the coalition, NDB and Z cooperate with the European Green Party, while Solidarity Platform is partnered with the Party of the European Left.

History

Background and formation 
Aleksandar Jovanović Ćuta, an activist and co-founder of the "Defend the Rivers of Stara Planina" organisation, organised and took part in environmental protests in January and April 2021. Around 60 environmental organisations took part in a protest in April, while the protests later continued after September. The Do not let Belgrade drown (NDB) movement, represented by Dobrica Veselinović and Radomir Lazović, and Together for Serbia (ZZS), led by Nebojša Zelenović, supported the environmental protests, and they formed a connection shortly after. The protests reached climax in late November and early December 2021, and they were regularly organised up till 15 February 2022. Zelenović formed the "Action", a political group built around ZZS that included 28 environmental civic groups that supported the "Green Agreement for Serbia", in June 2021. Lazović later presented a proposal for cooperation between opposition parties with Zelenović in September 2021. The media later dubbed the coalition between Ćuta, Lazović, and Zelenović as the "green-left bloc".

A cooperation agreement between Zelenović and Ćuta was signed in November 2021; additionally, they had announced a joint cooperation in the 2022 general election. On 19 January 2022, the coalition was formalised under the name We Must. During the presentation, it was announced that Ćuta would be head the parliamentary ballot list, Veselinović would head the Belgrade City Assembly ballot list, while Zelenović would represent the parliamentary ballot list. Zelenović stated that the members of the coalition had applied for the membership in the European Greens, and he cited the Spanish Podemos as the inspiration.

2022 election and aftermath 
The We Must coalition held its first campaign rally in Gornje Nedeljice on 27 February, where they had announced Biljana Stojković as their presidential candidate. The coalition also campaigned through out other locations in Serbia. The Slovenian The Left party stated its support for We Must in late March. The coalition won 4.7% of the popular vote and 13 seats in the National Assembly, while Stojković won 3.3% of the popular vote in the presidential election. Following the elections, Ćuta and Zelenović announced the formation of a joint political party, later revealed as Together. It was also announced that Stojković, Ćuta, and Zelenović would serve as co-leaders. During the same period, a conflict emerged due to the dispute over the coalition's name. NDB had claimed the name as its intellectual property, although it later withdrew the request that it had sent to the Intellectual Property Office (ZIS). Lazović argued that the intellectual property would be the property of the coalition, and not NDB. During an interview in June, Zelenović had affirmed that the coalition still exists. In late June, Together held a meeting with Party of Freedom and Justice (SSP) and Zdravko Ponoš; NDB did not participate. We Must split into two parliamentary groups during the first constitutive session of the thirteenth convocation of the National Assembly on 1 August. Zelenović stated that the Together parliamentary group would send an initiative regarding the ban of lithium and boron. NDB had stated that they would continue their cooperation with Together within the We Must coalition, while they would also serve in opposition and decline any cooperation with the Serbian Progressive Party (SNS) and Socialist Party of Serbia (SPS).

Ideology and position 
The We Must coalition was formed by the Together for Serbia (ZZS), Do not let Belgrade drown, and the Ecological Uprising movement, led by Aleksandar Jovanović Ćuta, that emphasised their support towards green politics. During their founding conference, its representatives stated that they would represent green-left values, and that some of their main goals would include the abandonment of Rio Tinto's plan to excavate lithium in Serbia, and to defeat the Serbian Progressive Party (SNS) in the 2022 election. Zelenović also stated that "it is necessary for Serbia to join the green transformations, otherwise it would remain a place for dirty technologies, cheap labor and colonization", and that Serbia should be more orientated towards the European Union and the Western world. Its leaders had stated support for "social justice and basic needs for every citizen", and had also commented that "we must overcome the authoritarian regimes in the Balkans". Moramo condemned the request of Dveri to cancel EuroPride in July 2022.

The We Must coalition has also been described as "the new faces of the opposition's left-wing", and were compared to the Croatian We can! party and the Montenegrin United Reform Action. The coalition cooperates with the European Greens, while it had also received support from the European Left during the 2022 electoral campaign. Political parties such as the German Die Linke, Danish Red–Green Alliance and Slovenian Levica had also voiced its support for We Must.

Members 
The coalition is also made up of the Local Front and the Forum of Romani People of Serbia.

Electoral performance

Parliamentary elections

Presidential elections

Belgrade City Assembly

References

2022 establishments in Serbia
Centre-left parties in Europe
European Green Party
Green political parties in Serbia
Left-wing political party alliances
Political opposition organizations
Political parties established in 2022
Political party alliances in Serbia
Pro-European political parties in Serbia